The Liberals (L), known as the Liberal People's Party until 22 November 2015, is a conservative liberal political party in Sweden. The Liberals ideologically have shown a broad variety of liberal tendencies. Currently they are seen as following classical liberalism and economic liberalism. The party is a member of the Liberal International and Renew Europe.

Historically the party was positioned in the centre of the Swedish political landscape, willing to cooperate with both the political left and the right. It has since the leaderships of Lars Leijonborg and Jan Björklund in the 2000s positioned itself more towards the right. It was a part of the Alliance centre-right coalition government led by Prime Minister Fredrik Reinfeldt from 2006 to 2014. The party's policies include action toward a free market economy and pushing for Sweden to join NATO and the Eurozone, as well as investing in nuclear power; it also focuses on gender equality, the school system and quality education.

In February 2019, following the conclusion of government negotiations, Jan Björklund announced his intention to step down from the leadership position after 11 years at the helm of the Liberals. He was succeeded by Nyamko Sabuni in June 2019. After the 2021 Swedish government crisis, the party withdrew their support for Social Democratic Prime Minister Stefan Löfven, and is now promoting a right-wing government together with the Moderate Party and the Christian Democrats, with support from the Sweden Democrats, with Ulf Kristersson as their Prime Minister candidate. In an interview with Dagens Nyheter in February 2022, Sabuni stated that the Sweden Democrats will "play an important role in an eventual right-wing government" and that she would not be hesitant to work and collaborate with them, stating that there is a possibility of Liberals supporting a Moderate-Christian Democrats-Sweden Democrats government, even if the Liberals are not included in the government. Since the decision to collaborate with the Sweden Democrats, the party has adopted more right-wing populist viewpoints, such as a more restrictive migration policy, easier withdrawal of citizenship for immigrants, and has strongly criticised Muslim schools. The party ultimately agreed to join the Tidö Agreement and form a coalition government with the Christian Democrats and the Moderate Party, which rely closely on support from the Sweden Democrats.

History

 1809: The first liberal party is formed after a coup d'état ends 20 years of royal autocracy under the Union and Security Act; it may be the first party in the world to use the word "liberal" in its name (This information needs to be verified with a citation. According to Bäck, Henry, Gissur Ó. Erlingsson and Torbjörn Larsson (2013.). Den svenska politiken: struktur, processer och resultat Stockholm: Liber, p. 49 a Liberal party was formed in the Parliament in 1900).
 1902: The Free-minded National Association is formed as the first liberal party with a national grassroots organisation. It is heavily reliant on the "free religious" church movement.
 1910: After women become eligible to be elected to municipal councils in Sweden, suffragette Valborg Olander is elected to the Falun city council for the Liberal Party.
 1923: The Free-minded National Association splits over alcohol prohibition; the anti-ban minority forms the Liberal Party of Sweden. The Free-minded would come to lead several governments during the coming years.
 1934: The parties reconcile and form the People's Party, i.e. the party in its present form.
 1939–45: It takes part in a wartime coalition government comprising all parties except the communists. Sweden remains neutral during the Second World War.
 1976: It enters a three-party government ending 44 years of Social Democratic Party rule (excepting the wartime emergency grand coalition).
 1978: The People's Party forms a short-lived minority government by itself, with chairperson Ola Ullsten as prime minister. Hans Blix served as a foreign minister.
 1979: A new attempt at a three-party coalition is made.
 1980–82: It forms a two-party coalition government with the Centre Party.
 1990: It adds Liberal to its name to become the Liberal People's Party.
 1991–94: It forms part of a four-party centre-right coalition government under Moderate Party leader Carl Bildt.
 2002: It more than doubles its vote share and comes close to being the second-largest party in Riksdag elections; party leader Lars Leijonborg fails to unite a green-liberal four-party coalition government with passive Moderate support.
 2006–14: It forms part of the Alliance four-party centre-right coalition government under Moderate Party leader Fredrik Reinfeldt.
 2015: It changes its name from the Liberal People's Party to the Liberals.
 2018: It, together with the Centre Party, voted down a proposed Moderate-Christian Democrat government led by Ulf Kristersson after concerns that such a government would be dependent on the Sweden Democrats for support.
 2019: It, together with the Centre Party, voted to tolerate a Social Democratic-Green government led by Stefan Löfven after coming up with a 73-point agreement. Jan Björklund also announced he will step down as party leader and will not stand in the party's autumn leadership contest.
2021: After the 2021 Swedish government crisis, the party withdraw their support for Löfven, and now supports a centre-right government with Ulf Kristersson as Prime Minister.
2022: In the parliamentary elections in September the party won 4.61% of votes and 16 places in the Swedish Parliament.
2022: The party agrees to form a coalition government with the Christian Democrats, Moderate Party and Sweden Democrats as part of the Tidö Agreement.

2006 computer hacking scandal

On 4 September 2006, only weeks before the 2006 general election, the Social Democratic Party reported to the police that its internal network had been hacked into. It has been reported that members of the Liberal People's Party had copied secret information not yet officially released to counter-attack Social Democrat political propositions on at least two occasions. On 5 September the Party Secretary, Johan Jakobsson, voluntarily chose to resign. Leading members of the party and its youth organisation were under police investigation suspected for criminal activity. All members of the party were acquitted by the court however, while an official of the party's youth organisation, as well as one from the Social Democrats and a newspaper reporter, were found guilty.

Ideology

The official party ideology has historically been social liberalism, which translates as a strong ideological commitment to a mixed economy, with support for comprehensive but market-based welfare state programs.

While initially allied with the Swedish Social Democratic Party in the struggle for democracy (achieved in 1921) and social reform, the People's Party came to be part of the opposition from the thirties and onwards, opposing Social Democrat demands for nationalization of private businesses. It has stayed opposed to the Social Democrats ever since, often as the largest or second-largest party of the opposition block (called the non-socialists or "de borgerliga", approximately the bourgeois), but often equally critical towards parties on the right. Over time, this has shifted towards a more clear-cut rightwing role. In the mid-nineties the party seemed to have ruled out the alternative of co-operation with the Social Democrats, focusing instead on bringing them down by strengthening the opposition.

Foreign policy is another high-profile issue. Always oriented towards the United States and the United Kingdom, the party was a strong opponent of Communism and Nazism during the 20th century. While it was part of and supported the Swedish coalition government and its position of neutrality during World War II, the party advocated an active stance against the Soviet Union during the Cold War. The party (alongside Moderaterna) actively supported the struggle of the Baltic peoples against the Soviet regime, whereas Social Democrats were wary of irritating the Soviets.  As a consequence, it suffered several sharply worded rebukes from the often-ruling Social Democrats for endangering Swedish relations with the Soviet Union. It also criticised what it perceived as Social Democrat tolerance of left-wing dictatorships in the third world, and supported the United States in the Vietnam War. After the end of the Cold War, it became the first Swedish party to call for abandoning the country's traditional neutrality in favor of joining NATO.

Among issues concerning the developing world, the party supported decolonization and advocated boycotting South Africa to help overthrow apartheid rule. It also opposed third world Communist dictatorships. Nowadays it is strongly supportive of Israel, and former Party leader Per Ahlmark has been especially vocal on the issue.

On the European level, the Liberal People's Party was strongly supportive of the emergence of the European Union and campaigned for Swedish entry into it (which happened in 1995). It also campaigned for joining the Economic and Monetary Union of the European Union, but this was voted down by the Swedes in a referendum in 2003. The party has aimed to come across as the most "pro-European" party, trying to break what it refers to as the country's "isolationist" mindset. It is supportive of EU enlargement, including letting Turkey join on condition of democratic reforms, and also advocates further integrative measures, with some members, including the youth organization, openly calling for a single federal European state.

In 2003 the Liberal People's Party supported the invasion of Iraq, but stopped short of demanding Swedish participation in the US-led "coalition of the willing". In recent years, and especially under the leadership of Jan Björklund, the party has moved markedly towards conservative liberalism in its social attitudes, taking tougher stands on areas such as crime and punishment, law and order, school and discipline as well as strengthening its abolitionist policies on drugs. In 2008 the Liberal People's Party's support for a controversial legislative change regulating the National Defence Radio Establishment (FRA) in particular upset its youth organisation.

Voter base

Statistical changes in voter base 

Historically the party had a strong base in the 'free churches' (Protestant congregations not part of the state church that turned into powerful grassroots movements in the late 19th century), but with the exception of certain regions, that is not a significant feature today. Tensions between factions sometimes described as "the free religionists" and "the metropolitan liberals" (occasionally in the form of an open left-right conflict, with the "free religious" members emphasizing the social aspect over liberal economics) was an important part of party life until the seventies. It provoked a party split in the twenties, centred on the question of an alcohol ban, but differences were eventually repaired. (The re-merging of the parties in 1934 is one of the party's plethora of official creation dates, some others being 1895, 1900 and 1902, providing frequent cause for anniversary celebrations.)

Support for the party is more marked among people above the age of 65, and tends to be higher among people who have completed more education. Its support is lowest among people with a pre-gymnasial education. The party's voters are predominantly urban with more than 30% of L-voters residing in Metropolitan Stockholm. The party's support is especially strong in affluent municipalities such as Danderyd, Lidingö and Lomma. According to Sveriges Television's exit poll for the 2019 European parliament election, voters of the Liberals were the most likely to approve of Sweden's EU membership. In September 2022, 84% of L-voters supported Sweden's bid to join NATO.

Affiliated organisations and international memberships

The party has a youth organization called Liberal Youth of Sweden (Liberala ungdomsförbundet, LUF), which has its own platform and maintains a separate organisation from the party.
Since 2019 its chairperson is Romina Pourmokhtari.

There is also a women's organization called Liberal Women (Liberala Kvinnor, LK, chairperson Cecilia Elving) and immigrants' organization called Liberal Mångfald, LM, (Liberal Multicultural Association, chairperson Anna Steele Karlström). Additionally, party members maintain a number of small ad hoc "networks" addressing specific issues.

Representation in the EU institutions 
The Liberals is a member of the Alliance of Liberals and Democrats for Europe and Liberal International. It is also part of Liberal organisations on the Nordic and Baltic levels. The party's MEP sits with Renew Europe parliamentary group (previously ALDE).

In the European Committee of the Regions, the Liberals sit in the Renew Europe CoR group with one full member for the 2020-2025 mandate.

Electoral results

Riksdag

European Parliament

Party leaders

Symbols

See also
Alliance (Sweden)
Liberal Youth of Sweden
Liberalism and centrism in Sweden
Fria liberaler i Svenska kyrkan

References

External links
 The Liberals: Sweden's liberal party - a factsheet about the party and its policies
 The Swedish Parliament: The Liberal Party

 
Alliance of Liberals and Democrats for Europe Party member parties
Centre-right parties in Sweden
Conservative liberal parties
Liberal International
Liberal parties in Sweden
1934 establishments in Sweden
Political parties established in 1934